Interstate 380 may refer to:

 Interstate 380 (California), a spur from Interstate 280 to U.S. Route 101 and the San Francisco International Airport
 Interstate 380 (Iowa), a spur from Interstate 80 that starts in Iowa City and eventually ends in Waterloo; nearly the entire route is concurrent with the Avenue of the Saints between St. Louis, Missouri and St. Paul, Minnesota
 Interstate 380 (Pennsylvania), a connection between Interstate 80 and Interstate 81 south of Scranton
 Interstate 380 (Ohio), a proposed connection between Interstate 76/Interstate 77 and Interstate 80 that is currently a part of Ohio State Route 8

See also
 

80-3
3